Leśniak is a Polish surname. It may refer to:
 Jan Leśniak (1898–1976), Polish military intelligence officer in the Interbellum and World War II
 Jerzy Leśniak (born 1957), Polish journalist, author and historian of the city of Nowy Sącz and the whole region of Sądecczyzna
 Marek Leśniak (born 1964), Polish retired footballer and current coach
 Natalia Leśniak (born 1991), Polish archer
 Raymond Lesniak, a New Jersey senator un til 2018 
 Zbigniew Leśniak (born 1950), Polish former slalom canoeist

Polish-language surnames